The Bua language (also called Ba) is spoken north of the Chari River around Korbol and Gabil in Chad. In 1993 it was spoken by some 8,000 people. It is the largest member of the small Bua group of languages and is mutually comprehensible with Fanian. Kawãwãy (Korom) may be a dialect or a distinct language.

Bua is a local lingua franca in Korbol Canton, due to the historical influence of the Korbol Caliphate since the late 1700s and 1800s. Speakers also live around Gabil (in the Guéra Region), and in Sarh and N'Djaména.

Korom
Korom is spoken by about 60 people in 3 or 4 villages in Moyen-Chari Region and Guéra Region of Chad. The main community of speakers is called Kawãwãy, who comprise a community of blacksmiths in Tili Nugar (Tilé Nougar), a Fania village. The language has been documented by Florian Lionnet and R. Hoinathy in 2014 and 2017. Lionnet considers Korom to be separate language closely related to Bua.

References

Further reading
 P. A. Benton, Languages and Peoples of Bornu Vol. I, Frank Cass & Co:London 1912 (1st ed.)/1968 (2nd ed.)  Gives Barth's unpublished vocabulary of Bua on pp. 78–130.
 M. Gaudefroy-Demombynes, Documents sur les langues de l'Oubangui-Chari, Paris, 1907.  Includes (pp. 107–122) a 200-word comparative list of Bua, Niellim, Fanian, and Tunia, with a brief grammar and some phrases collected by Decorse.
 J. Lukas, Zentralsudanisches Studien, Hamburg, Friedrichsen, de Gruyter & Cie, 1937.  Gives the wordlists of Nachtigal, zu Mecklenburg, Barth, and Gaudefroy-Demombynes for Bua (~400 words), Niellim (~200 words), and Koke (~100 words).
 A. N. Tucker & M. A. Bryan, The Non-Bantu Languages of North-Eastern Africa, Handbook of African Languages, part III, Oxford University Press for International African Institute, 1956.  Summarizes the grammar of Bua and two relatives based on existing fieldwork.

Languages of Chad
Bua languages